Anthony Hunt (born 1976), better known by his stage name Ampichino or Amp, is an American rapper and producer from Akron, Ohio. His 2002 single "Do the Damn Thang" featuring Yukmouth peaked at #15 on the Hot Rap Songs and Bubbling Under R&B/Hip-Hop Songs chart.

Ampichino is a member of the group the Regime and the collaborative effort Devilz Rejectz with The Jacka of Mob Figaz.

Career
Ampichino joined Yukmouth's hip-hop collective the Regime in 2001. Ampichino has been on numerous national releases. He was also on the soundtrack to the movie Hostel. He has worked with many platinum producers such as Mike Mosely, Mike Dean, Rhythm D, and Mr. Lee.

Discography

Studio albums
 Intergalactical (2002)
 Ak-47 - Soundtrack To the Streets (2005)
 Mysery (2008)
 Dark Night (2008)
 Da Krazies (2010)
 Cop Heavy Gang "Going All In" (2011)
 Cop Heavy Gang 2: Right Back, Ain't Cheatin''' (2012)
 Da Krazies 2 (2013)
 The Eulogy (2015)
 The Lost Sessions (2015)
  Featuring Ampichino (2015)
 Pack Money (2015)
 Chasin Chicken (2017)
 Lost Sessions 2 (2019)
 Quarantine (2020)
 Quarantine 2 (2021)

Collaborative albums

With The Jacka
 Devilz Rejectz: 36 Zipz (2007)
 Devilz Rejects 2: House of the Dead' (2010) - #88 R&B/Hip-Hop Albums
 Devilz Rejectz 3: American Horror Story (2018) - #13 R&B/Hip-Hop Albums

With Young Bossi
  Stock Xchange (2006)
 City of G'z (2007)
 City of G'z 2 (2010)
 Cop Heavy Gang (2011)
 Cop Heavy Gang 2 (2012)
 Cop Heavy Gang "Lost Work" (2016)

With Berner
 Breathe/Dreaming (2015) - #69 R&B/Hip-Hop Albums
 Traffic 1 (2009)
 Traffic 2 (2010)

With Shoboat
 Dead Presidents (2011)               
 Dead Presidents 2 (2017)

With D-Rek
 Trill Shottaz (2012)

With P3
 MOB2K15 (2015)

With Chey Dolla
 Dope Dealers Emporium (2016)

With Malvo
 Mobb Classicks (2016)

With King Locust
 The AK (2016)

With the ReGime
 All Out War, Volume I (2005)
 All Out War, Volume II (2005)
 All Out War, Volume III (2006)
 The Last Dragon (2013)
 Dragon Gang (2013)

With KJizzle
 Betrayal (2018)

With Interstate Fatz
 Interstate Amp (2018)

With Hoggy D
 War Dogs'' (2021)

References

External links
Official website
Official Ampichino Twitter
Official Ampichino Facebook
Official Ampchino MySpace

Midwest hip hop musicians
Rappers from Ohio
Musicians from Akron, Ohio
Living people
Gangsta rappers
21st-century American rappers
1976 births